The Polar Star is a 1919 British silent mystery film directed by Arrigo Bocchi and starring Manora Thew, Hayford Hobbs and Peggy Patterson. The screenplay concerns a London soliciter who is killed in mysterious circumstances in Italy.

It was made at Catford Studios and on location in Italy.

Cast
 Manora Thew  
 Hayford Hobbs   
 Peggy Patterson  
 Bert Wynne   
 Charles Vane

References

Bibliography
 Low, Rachael. History of the British Film, 1918–1929. George Allen & Unwin, 1971.

External links

1919 films
1919 crime films
1919 mystery films
British silent feature films
British mystery films
British crime films
Films set in London
Films set in Italy
Films directed by Arrigo Bocchi
British black-and-white films
1910s English-language films
1910s British films
Silent mystery films